Radek Havel (born 25 February 1961) is a Czech swimmer. He competed in three events at the 1980 Summer Olympics.

References

External links
 

1961 births
Living people
Czech male swimmers
Olympic swimmers of Czechoslovakia
Swimmers at the 1980 Summer Olympics
Place of birth missing (living people)